"Ocean" was the second single by Australian rock group Spencer Tracy and was released on Embryro Records 2 June 2003. 

"Ocean" reached #14 on the Australian Independent Record Labels Association (AIR) top 20 singles charts in September 2003.

Track listing
All tracks written by Lee Jones.

 "Ocean" - 4:01
 "She's Really Somethin'" 
 "So Alone"

References

2003 singles
Spencer Tracy (band) songs
2003 songs